Oluniké Adeliyi (born January 5, 1977) is a Canadian actress. She appeared in the 2010 horror film Saw 3D and starred as Leah Kerns in the television series Flashpoint.

Early life
Adeliyi was born in Brampton, Ontario, of Jamaican-Nigerian descent. She frequently visited Brooklyn, New York to pursue acting. She graduated from the American Academy of Dramatic Arts, performing in local theater, before returning to Toronto in 2008.

Career
Adeliyi began acting when she was cast as the Artful Dodger in her middle school play Oliver Twist. After graduating high school, she went to the American Academy of Dramatic Arts in New York City, and has since performed in theatres throughout Canada and the U.S. playing leading roles in Blue Window, A Midsummer Night's Dream, The Children's Hour, Jitney, and Michael Cristofer's play The Shadow Box.

One of her earliest film roles was an uncredited bit part in the film John Q.; on set, she met Denzel Washington, who she said "inspired" her to continue pursuing acting. In 2009 she starred as the lead in the AfriCan Theatre Ensemble production of Efua Sutherland's The Marriage of Anansewa. Also that year, she starred in the Canadian TV series Flashpoint. She was nominated for Best Performance by a Female – Film at the 2012 Canadian Comedy Awards for her performance in French Immersion.

In 2014, Adeliyi was dubbed "Shakespeare’s First Jamaican-Nigerian Lady Macbeth" when she played the role at the Sterling Theatre in Toronto.

As of 2017, Adeliyi  stars on the CBC series Workin' Moms.

In 2018 she received a Canadian Screen Award nomination for Best Supporting Actress at the 6th Canadian Screen Awards, for her role in the film Boost.

Personal life
She lives with her daughter, Alesha, who appeared in several episodes of the TVOKids series Taste Buds.

Controversy 

In 2017, Adeliyi attracted media attention in Canada after an incident at Toronto's Kingsway Theatre.  The establishment does not allow backpacks into its theatre, and Adeliyi would not leave her backpack for safekeeping with theatre staff.  Theatre staff refused to sell her a ticket, and when she refused to leave, police were called.  Adeliyi claimed she was discriminated against by the theatre staff, who filmed her, while the theatre staff claim they were following protocol. After police were called, Adeliyi was escorted out of the theatre. Adeliyi described the experience as "dehumanizing," and in an interview with the Toronto Star, she spoke further of the experience, saying:I take offence to being labelled dangerous and that is what happened . . . When things happen like that, it can go any way, and people can get hurt . . . it compromises the person who [is] accused of something, and that is not fair.

Theatre owner Rui Pereira described Adeliyi as "abusive", saying she "slammed her bag on the counter and demanded a ticket", and then refused to leave when told to by staff.

Filmography

Film

Television

Video games

References

External links
 
 

1977 births
Living people
Actresses from Ontario
Canadian film actresses
Canadian stage actresses
Canadian television actresses
Black Canadian actresses
People from Brampton
Canadian people of Nigerian descent
Canadian people of Jamaican descent
American Academy of Dramatic Arts alumni